Groombridge 1618 is a star in the northern constellation Ursa Major. With an apparent visual magnitude of +6.6, it lies at or below the threshold of stars visible to the naked eye for an average observer. This is a main sequence star of spectral type K7.5 Ve, having just 67% of the Sun's mass.

Properties
This star was first identified as entry 1618 in the work A Catalog of Circumpolar Stars by Stephen Groombridge  published posthumously in 1838. It has such a proper motion across the sky that it guaranteed the star was quite nearby and made it an early candidate for parallax measurements.

Groombridge 1618 has a stellar classification of K8 V, which means it is a K-type main sequence star that is generating energy by fusing hydrogen at its core. It has 67% of the mass of the Sun, 61% of the Sun's radius, but radiates only 15% of the Sun's energy and only 4.6% of the Sun's energy in the visible light spectrum. The effective surface temperature of the star's photosphere is about 4,000 K, giving it an orange hue.

It is a BY Draconis variable with a surface magnetic field strength of 750 G. The chromosphere is relatively inactive and produces star spots comparable to Sun spots. However, like UV Ceti, it has been observed to undergo increases in luminosity as a flare star.

Search for planets
A search for excess infrared emission from this star by the Infrared Space Observatory came up negative, implying that Groombridge 1618 does not possess
a nearby debris disk (such as Vega does). However, observations using the Herschel Space Observatory showed a small excess suggesting a low-temperature debris disk. The data can be modeled by a ring of coarse, highly-reflective dust at a temperature below 22 K orbiting at least 51 AU from the host star. If this star does have a companion, astrometric measurements appear to place an upper bound of 3–12 times the mass of Jupiter on such a hypothetical object (for orbital periods in the range of 5–50 years).

Observations collated by Marcy & Benitz (1989), tend towards a single notable object with periodicity of 122 days as a planetary object with minimum mass 4 times that of Jupiter. This candidate planet was never confirmed and the signal the authors had found could have been due to intrinsic stellar activity from the star's young age.
If confirmed, the planet would be within the star's habitable zone.

An examination of this system in 2010 using the MMT telescope fitted with adaptive optics failed to detect a planetary companion.

The habitable zone for this star, defined where liquid water could be present on an Earth-like planet, is at a radius of 0.26–0.56 AU, where 1 AU is the average distance from the Earth to the Sun.

The star is among five nearby K-type stars of a type in a 'sweet spot’ between Sun-analog stars and M stars for the likelihood of evolved life, per analysis of Giada Arney from NASA’s Goddard Space Flight Center.

See also
 Stephen Groombridge
 List of nearest stars

Notes

References

Notes

External links

K-type main-sequence stars
Local Bubble
Ursa Major (constellation)
Flare stars
Hypothetical planetary systems
088230
049908
0380
1618
BD+50 1725
TIC objects